The 1919 Idaho Vandals football team represented the University of Idaho in the 1919 college football season. Idaho was led by first-year head coach Ralph Hutchinson and played as an independent; they joined the Pacific Coast Conference in 1922. The Vandals had two home games in Moscow on campus at MacLean Field, with none in Boise.

Idaho dropped a fifth consecutive game to Washington State in the Battle of the Palouse, falling  at Rogers Field in Pullman. Four years later, the Vandals won the first of three consecutive, their only three-peat in the rivalry series.

Idaho opened with three losses, then won twice for a  record.

Schedule

References

External links
Gem of the Mountains: 1921 University of Idaho yearbook (spring 1920) – 1919 football season
Go Mighty Vandals – 1919 football season
Official game program: Idaho at Washington State – November 1, 1919
Idaho Argonaut – student newspaper – 1919 editions

Idaho
Idaho Vandals football seasons
Idaho Vandals football